The Machinga are a Bantu ethnic and linguistic group native to Kilwa District of Lindi Region on the southern Indian Ocean coast of Tanzania.  In 1987 the Machinga population was estimated to be 36,000 people.

References

Ethnic groups in Tanzania
Indigenous peoples of East Africa